Walnut Township is a township in Jewell County, Kansas, USA.  As of the 2000 census, its population was 80.

Geography
Walnut Township covers an area of 39.46 square miles (102.21 square kilometers); of this, 0.03 square miles (0.07 square kilometers) or 0.07 percent is water.

Unincorporated towns
 Northbranch

(This list is based on USGS data and may include former settlements.)

Adjacent townships
 Harrison Township (east)
 Holmwood Township (southeast)
 Burr Oak Township (south)
 White Mound Township (southwest)
 Highland Township (west)

Major highways
 K-128

References
 U.S. Board on Geographic Names (GNIS)
 United States Census Bureau cartographic boundary files

External links
 US-Counties.com
 City-Data.com

Townships in Jewell County, Kansas
Townships in Kansas